Icon is a compilation album by Joe Cocker, released in 2011 (see 2011 in music).

Track listing
"The Letter" (live) − 4:36
"High Time We Went" − 4:30
"You Are So Beautiful" − 2:44
"Feelin' Alright" − 4:11
"Delta Lady" − 2:52
"Cry Me a River" (live) − 3:59
"She Came In Through the Bathroom Window" − 2:40
"Darling Be Home Soon" − 4:43
"Woman to Woman" − 4:29
"Midnight Rider" − 3:59
"Something" − 3:35
"With a Little Help from My Friends" − 5:12

References

Joe Cocker compilation albums
2011 compilation albums
A&M Records compilation albums